Leucopogon concurvus is a species of flowering plant in the heath family Ericaceae and is endemic to a restricted part of South Australia. It is a slender shrub with egg-shaped leaves, and white, tube-shaped flowers arranged along the branches.

Description
The upper surface of the leaves is glabrous and the lower surface usually covered with bristly hairs. The anthers and style do not extend beyond the end of the petal tube.

Taxonomy
Leucopogon concurvus was first formally described in 1863 by Ferdinand von Mueller in his Fragmenta Phytographiae Australiae.

Distribution and habitat
This leucopogon grows in forest, mallee scrub and heath, sometimes near the edge of swamps and in endemic to the southern Mount Lofty Ranges and Kangaroo Island in South Australia.

References

concurvus
Ericales of Australia
Flora of South Australia
Plants described in 1863
Taxa named by Ferdinand von Mueller